Estación Atlántida is a northern suburb of the city Atlántida in the Canelones Department of southern Uruguay.

Geography

Location
The railroad track that connects Montevideo with the city of Rocha passes from this place.

Population
In 2011 Estación Atlántida had a population of 2,274.
 
Source: Instituto Nacional de Estadística de Uruguay

Places of worship
 Parish Church of Christ the Worker and Our Lady of Lourdes (Roman Catholic), a wonderful architectural landmark of modernist architecture, built in 1958-60 by Eladio Dieste.

References

External links
INE map of Villa Argentina, Atlántida, Estación Atlántida, Las Toscas, City Golf, and Fortin de Santa Rosa 

Populated places in the Canelones Department